Bandi Shungli, or Shungli Bandi, is a village and union council of Oghi Tehsil in Mansehra District in the north-east of the Khyber Pakhtunkhwa province of Pakistan.

Demographics 
The main languages of the region are Hindko and Gojri, followed by Pashto. In the village of Danna the endangered Mankiyali language is spoken.

There is one government Higher Secondary School for boys and one middle school for boys and girls.

Nearly all population is of the Sunni sect.

Settlements
Major villages consists of
Shungli, Gali, Patean, Sunj, Kaladakha, Harian, Temarthaarha, Utli Bai, Tarli Bai, Keela, Galdar, Chontra, Chatha, Porian, Danna, Shoshni, Chemrasi, Nawan Sher, Arghina, Basengarh, Jubberh, Naka, Foghorah, Pubbal, Neel Battla Bala, Malkana, Chakal, bandi, dhok. Takiya the most prominent and significant icon of Bandi Shungli.

References

Union councils of Mansehra District
Populated places in Mansehra District